Battaglia is an Italian surname. Notable people with the surname include:

 Adolfo Battaglia (born 1930), Italian journalist and politician 
 Anthony J. Battaglia (born 1949), American jurist
 Aurelius Battaglia (1910–1984), American illustrator
 Bates Battaglia (born 1975), American ice hockey player
 Bryan B. Battaglia (born 1961), American military advisor
 Carlo Battaglia (1933–2005), Italian designer
 Daniele Battaglia (born 1981), Italian singer and television personality
 David Peter Battaglia (1931–2017), American politician
 Dino Battaglia (1923–1983), Italian comic artist
 Domenico Battaglia (1842–1904), Italian painter, mainly of interior vedute
 Domenico Battaglia (bishop) (born 1963), Italian Archbishop-elect of Naples 
 Elio Battaglia, Italian baritone and singing teacher
 Francine Battaglia, American aerospace engineer
 Frank Battaglia, the only Italian-American police commissioner of Baltimore
 Giuseppe Battaglia (died 1669), Roman Catholic prelate who served as Bishop of Montemarano
 Faith and Liberty Battaglia, murder victims
 Fern Battaglia (1931–2001), All-American Girls Professional Baseball League
 Frank Battaglia, American police officer and commissioner
 Frank Battaglia (boxer) (1910–1973), Canadian boxer 
 Frank "Frankie" Battaglia (1910–1971) Boxer, Olympian
 Francesco Battaglia (footballer), Italian footballer
 Georginna Battaglia Benitez (born 1995), Paraguayan handball player in the Paraguay national team
 Giovanna Battaglia Engelbert (born 1979), Italian fashion editor and Creative Director
 Giovanni Battaglia Pergolesi (born 1893), Italian racing driver.
 Guillermo Battaglia (1899–1988), Argentine film actor
 John Battaglia, murderer
 Jorge Battaglia (born 1960), Paraguayan football goalkeeper 
 Juan Manuel Battaglia (born 1957), Paraguayan football midfielder
 Kaci Battaglia (born 1987), American singer
 Letizia Battaglia (1935–2022), Italian photographer, journalist and editor
 Lynne A. Battaglia, American lawyer and jurist
 Marco Battaglia (born 1973), National Football League player
 Matt Battaglia (born 1965), American actor and producer
 Miguel Battaglia, Italian-Brazilian tailor and football chairman
 Mike Battaglia, American horse racing analyst
 Rik Battaglia (1927–2015), Italian actor
 Roberto Battaglia (1909–1965), Italian fencer
 Rodrigo Battaglia (born 1991), Argentine football midfielder
 Ryan Battaglia (born 1992), Australian baseball player
 Salvatore Battaglia (born 1975), Italian boxer
 Sam Battaglia (1908–1973), American mobster
 Sara Battaglia (born 1994), Italian fashion designer and the founder of the Sara Battaglia fashion label
 Sebastián Battaglia (born 1980), Argentine professional footballer
 Skip Battaglia, American filmmaker and animator
 Stefano Battaglia (born 1965), Italian classical and jazz pianist

Italian-language surnames